The Halcyon is an unreleased home video game console produced by RDI Video Systems. The system was planned to be released in January 1985, with initial retail price for the system being . Fewer than a dozen units are known to exist and it never reached retailers because of a lack of affordable disc players. The design featured a LaserDisc player and attached computer, each the size of an early-model VCR. Of the six games planned, only two games were released: Thayer's Quest and NFL Football LA Raiders vs SD Chargers. RDI Video Systems claimed that the system would be entirely voice-activated, and would have an artificial intelligence akin to HAL 9000 from 2001: A Space Odyssey.

History
Rick Dyer was one of the many fans of the interactive fiction game Adventure, and wanted to develop his own game, Shadoan, which was an expansive fantasy game inspired by The Lord of the Rings. He envisioned a game that would feature illustrations of every scene, and developed a prototype called "Secrets of the Lost Woods" (a small section of his larger Shadoan game) that used a roll of printing calculator tape that could be wound forward and backward via microprocessor to show illustrations and information drawn on its surface. Later this was refined to use a filmstrip projector that was synchronized to a tape recording of a narrator reading the text normally shown by the game as the player entered each scene. With the advent of the videodisc player, Dyer realized he could consolidate the audio and visual content onto one medium, and created a device called The Fantasy Machine. Presentations of this device to prospective toy manufacturers failed.

Later it was realized that still images with narration were insufficient to capture the toy market, so animation projects began. The first project was titled Dragon's Lair, which, like "Secrets of the Lost Woods," was a smaller section of Dyer's envisioned Shadoan game.

Dragon's Lair and Space Ace supplied enough profits and credibility for RDI Video Systems to progress toward realizing their technology into a home entertainment and edutainment format.

To help control the consumer price of this unit, it was first designed around the RCA Capacitance Electronic Disc player. When RCA canceled the production of these players prior to the completion of the Halcyon project, it was re-designed to use a laserdisc. One of the biggest obstacles in this re-design (after its significantly higher cost) was the short 30-minute-per-side capacity of Constant Angular Velocity or random access laserdiscs.

System costs were intended to be ranged from  depending on the model. Suffering from a retail price tag that would discourage consumers and content that would require several laserdiscs to contain, investors and manufacturers saw little success in the future of Halcyon. Its few hand-assembled prototypes went into the hands of certain investors and collectors. Well-known names among these investors included Merv Griffin, Quinn Martin and Cassandra Peterson. In December 1985, Beverly Stereo and Video put their stock of RDI Halcyon consoles on clearance for $999.

Ironically, Dragon's Lair was not part of Halcyon's initial content repertoire. The Secrets of the Lost Woods footage was used to develop firmware for the unit prior to Fred Wolf's production of the Thayer's Quest animation.

The National Videogame Museum has the console on display.

Technical details

Hardware
Halcyon was based around the Z80 microprocessor, with its 64K memory partitioned out to ROM and RAM. A separate speech recognition computer provided the additional power needed to recognize human speech. Its firmware was proprietary, and its chief communications with the Z80 were indications of what word it had recognized, and what probability of confidence it calculated for the match. Other functions this subsystem provided were non-volatile memory storage, and speech recognition training.

Video content existed on a special computer-controlled CED player provided by RCA. Because of video encoding and stylus positioning constraints inherent in this technology, still frames (where action would be suspended pending player input) had to be encoded as a repeat of 2 or 3 seconds of video. Late in its development, Halcyon had to be re-designed to use Laserdisc players because CED units were put out of production by RCA. The Laserdisk used by Halcyon was an unbadged unit made by Pioneer Corporation.

Communications with CED players were serial. Communications with Laserdisc players were via infrared LED attached via suction cup.

Speech synthesis was produced using a licensed text-to-speech algorithm included as part of the base Halcyon Operating System, including a special English vocabulary which would correctly pronounce hundreds of proper names. The phonetic output of this algorithm was fed into a Votrax chip.

Software
Firmware unique to the game being played existed as a removable ROM cartridge containing 16K memory, including the entire game node layout, vocabulary of the game (both for the speech synthesizer and speech recognizer), inventory data (both for gameplay as well as video still frames depicting items), and certain executable data sections to assist in the processing of game flow.

Save for the words "Yes" and "No," Halcyon required each player to train it to recognize their voice. The words "Yes" and "No" existed as four samples of human voices pre-loaded into memory, two female and two male. Each voice was selected for their unique pitch and timbre properties. These four gave a high probability match for Halcyon to recognize from any given English speaker.

Speech recognition was discontiguous, meaning the player had only a few seconds to speak into a headset when prompted. This headset was equipped with a noise-canceling microphone to help isolate speech from any other sounds. Speech samples would be compared against allowed responses, and a match along with probability of accuracy would be sent to the Halcyon main processor.

To acknowledge voice commands, Halcyon would reiterate what it believed it "heard" the player say. This sometimes resulted in incorrect actions taken, especially if the player had a significantly different inflection or spoke something different from the choices expected. Probability ranking could trigger Halcyon to ask the player to repeat their choice when it received a poor match to all expected responses. Mis-recognitions were chiefly the result of a sample of speech given sufficient probability to match one of the anticipated words or phrases.

Halcyon was intended to have a voice much like the Hal 9000, but memory constraints prohibited the use of tailored speech parameters for the Votrax synthesizer that was built into the console. The compromise was to use a licensed text-to-speech algorithm that had several built-in rules for pronouncing English text properly. For speech the console made that the algorithm did not pronounce acceptably, special spelling was incorporated into the source text of words and phrases to correct for these problems. This would not correct the words (user names, primarily) that were typed into the Halcyon when a player first began playing the game.

A video game would follow a general design of "nodes" which interconnected based upon responses and lack of responses from a player. Certain triggers, such as a real-time constraint under which the game would be interrupted if its associated event did not occur, were also part of the game's dynamic.

Scenes existed as 2 or more scripts: One for the "normal" or first encounter with the scene; one for subsequent visits; optionally one or two for where certain actions required the scene animation or graphics to deviate, usually where an item has been removed or used.

A scene had to be identical in animation and graphics between its normal and subsequent visit, differing only in the audio track used. For this reason, lip sync was not required to be included in the animation, often resulting in speaking characters having their mouths obscured or speaking with their backs turned.

A scene with an item used or removed would have separate animation and graphics, allowing for 2 additional audio tracks, again without lip sync.

Audio tracks were encoded into the left and right channels of a stereo encoding, therefore only monaural audio would be played from any given instance of a scene.

Almost all scenes in a game would have some information revealed that would contribute to solving the puzzle of obtaining the final goal of the game. Since Halcyon needed to keep track of first versus subsequent visits, a count of visits (up to a maximum of 15) would be used to trigger its speech synthesized hints and comments. One example from Thayer's Quest would be the direct instruction to take the right door when the wrong door (leading to instant death) was chosen more than once.

To break up the monotony of robotic speech, Halcyon was given prompt and response phrases that had markers that would include interchangeable words and phrases, along with the Player's name which it would include occasionally. "Enter your name on my keyboard" and "Please spell your name" would be two examples of phrases it would use to prompt the player.

Halcyon's game authoring method would easily accommodate playing Dragon's Lair, except for the restraint that speech recognition would take too long to process each move before the time allowed would expire, limiting it to keyboard-only use. This game's inclusion was not considered for this reason as well as license restrictions.

Each player's game record was represented in non-volatile memory as the set of items they had in their inventory, the visit counters of all possible nodes in the game (unvisited nodes having a count of zero), the scene toggle information (item used/taken/etc.), applicable timers (real-time events would suspend when games were saved), and their trained speech sampled data. To resume play, all one had to do was speak their name when asked to do so by Halcyon.

References

LaserDisc video games
Home video game consoles
Third-generation video game consoles
Products introduced in 1985
Z80-based video game consoles
Vaporware game consoles
Devices capable of speech recognition